Department of Science and Technology, Bihar is a department of Government of Bihar. It is the administrative body for all technical institutions established by Government of Bihar. The department is responsible for the development and policy decision in the field of science and technology. It regulates scientific and technical education in colleges and universities of Bihar.

History 
The department was originally called Industry and Technical Education Department and was controlled by Department of Industry, Bihar. It became an independent department in 1973. In 2007, the Department of Information Technology was split from the Department of Science and Technology to become an independent department.

References

External links 
 

Government Departments of Bihar